Natalia Mikhailovna Gemperle (née Vinogradova, born 9 December 1990) is a Russian orienteering competitor. She competes for the clubs Vladimirskaya oblast, Alfta-Ösa and OLK Aargus 

At the 2016 World Orienteering Championships in Strömstad she won a silver medal in the long distance, a bronze medal in the middle distance, and a gold medal with the Russian relay team.

She participated in The World Games in Wroclaw, Poland winning a silver at the middle distance race and a bronze medal in the mixed relay.

References

External links
 

1990 births
Living people
Russian orienteers
Female orienteers
Foot orienteers
World Orienteering Championships medalists
World Games bronze medalists
Competitors at the 2017 World Games
World Games silver medalists
World Games medalists in orienteering
21st-century Russian women